Michael Young (16 December 1958 – 16 September 2018) was an Australian rules footballer who played for the Carlton Football Club and Melbourne Football Club in the Victorian Football League (VFL). He was also listed at the Essendon Football Club, but did not play a game.

Young made his debut with Carlton midway into the 1977 season and played as a wingman in Carlton's 1979 premiership side. He crossed to Melbourne in 1981.

He died from cancer in September 2018.

References

External links

Blueseum profile

1958 births
2018 deaths
Carlton Football Club players
Carlton Football Club Premiership players
Melbourne Football Club players
Clarence Football Club players
Tasmanian State of Origin players
Australian rules footballers from Tasmania
One-time VFL/AFL Premiership players